Cram Motorsport (formerly known as Cram Competition) is an auto racing team based in Italy.

Cram started in 1994 out of the Tatuus racing department. It has participated in Formula Alfa Boxer, Formula Renault 2000, Formula 3 Germany, Formula Master, Formula Renault World Series, Formula Abarth, Porsche Carrera Cup, Formula Renault 2.0 and FIA Formula 4.

Current series results

Formula 4 UAE Championship

Italian F4 Championship

F4 Spanish Championship

Former Series Results

Italian GT Championship - GT4 Am

Timeline

References

External links
 

Italian auto racing teams
World Series Formula V8 3.5 teams
Formula Renault Eurocup teams
International Formula Masters teams

British Formula Renault teams
German Formula 3 teams
Auto racing teams established in 1994